KMHS may refer to:

Radio stations
 KMHS (AM), a radio station (1420 AM) licensed to Coos Bay, Oregon, US
 KMHS-FM, a radio station (91.3 FM) licensed to Coos Bay, Oregon, US

High schools
 Kariong Mountains High School, Kariong, New South Wales, Australia
 Kasson-Mantorville High School, Kasson, Minnesota, US
 Kellenberg Memorial High School, Uniondale, New York, US
 Kennesaw Mountain High School, Kennesaw, Georgia, US
 Kettle Moraine High School, Wales, Wisconsin, US
 Kings Mountain High School, Kings Mountain, North Carolina, US